Claudio Baggini (1 August 1936 – 25 September 2015) was an Italian Roman Catholic bishop.

Baggini was born in Rome and was ordained a priest on 14 June 1959. He served as the Bishop of Vigevano from 18 March 2000 until his resignation on 12 March 2011.

During his ministry he welcomed pope Benedict XVI on pastoral visit to Vigevano, April 21, 2007, and assisted the beatification of Francesco Pianzola, celebrated in the cathedral of Vigevano by Cardinal José Saraiva Martins, on 4 October 2008.

He died on 25 September 2015 in Lodi at the age of 79.

References

1936 births
2015 deaths
21st-century Italian Roman Catholic bishops
Clergy from Rome